The Coeur d'Alene Masonic Temple in Coeur d'Alene, Idaho is a building constructed during 1909–1911. It was listed on the National Register of Historic Places in 1978.

The building includes terra cotta and iron ornamentation.  It was designed by Coeur d'Alene architect George Williams, who was himself active in the Scottish Rite order of the Masons.  It was deemed "architecturally significant as a good example of a Renaissance Revival building in Coeur d'Alene.

References

Clubhouses on the National Register of Historic Places in Idaho
Masonic buildings completed in 1909
Masonic buildings in Idaho
Renaissance Revival architecture in Idaho
National Register of Historic Places in Kootenai County, Idaho
Buildings and structures in Coeur d'Alene, Idaho